Fluoroalcohols are organofluorine compounds consisting of an alcohol functional group with at least one C-F bond.  These compounds often have distinctive solvent properties.

Perfluoroalcohols
Most primary and secondary perfluoroalcohols are unstable,  for example trifluoromethanol eliminates hydrogen fluoride, forming carbonyl fluoride. This reaction is reversible.

 ⇌  +  (I)

Stable perfluorinated alcohols include nonafluoro-tert-butyl alcohol ((CF3)3COH) and pentafluorophenol (C6F5OH).

Partially fluorinated alcohols
Numerous partially fluorinated alcohols are known.  Trifluoroethanol is a popular solvent.  Fluorotelomer alcohols are precursors to perfluorocarboxylic acids. Pirkle's alcohol is used a chiral shift reagent in nuclear magnetic resonance spectroscopy.

References

Organofluorides
Alcohols